Edgar Brothers is a British company registered at Companies House as Ian Edgar (Liverpool) Limited. Their main business is as a firearms wholesaler.

Edgar Brothers has been awarded in excess of £5.5 million worth of Ministry of Defence, Defence Equipment and Support (DE&S) contracts within the United Kingdom.

History
Edgar Brothers was founded in 1947. Its business divisions include shooting sports, outdoors and a police and military division.

Government procurement contracts

Light Weapons, Photography and Batteries (LWPB) Project Team
Edgar Brothers is the sole exclusive distributor for the Light Weapons, Photography & Batteries (LWPB) Project Team, which is part of the Ministry of Defence's Defence Equipment and Support (DE&S) division. In August 2011. the company won a £3 million procurement contract to supply in-service weapons, optics and ancillaries to the project. The contract was negotiated without a call for tenders from rival firms under UK Public Contracts Regulations 2006 as Edgar Brothers has exclusive distributor status.

Defence General Munitions (DGM) Project Team
In October 2012, Edgar Brothers won a three-year contract with a two-year option to extend worth £1,030,220, for the supply of specialist munitions to the Defence General Munitions (DGM) Project Team, which is also part of the Ministry of Defence's Defence Equipment and Support (DE&S) division. The contract was negotiated without prior publication for rival firms to be able to bid under Defence and Security Public Contracts Regulations 2011. This was due to Black Hills owning the intellectual property rights of the necessary ammunition, and Edgar Brothers being the exclusive agent for Black Hills within the UK. The option to extend for two years for was taken up in April 2014 costing the DGM Project Team a further £1,474,832.

Sponsorship
In 2012, Edgar Brothers announced that it would be sponsoring two sporting events, the Clay Pigeon Shooting Association's (CPSA's) British Open Sporting Championship, and, as shotgun brand Zoli, the CPSA/NSCA's (National Sporting Clays Association's) World Sporting Championship.

Edgar Brothers also produce a promotional calendar each year.

Business divisions

 Shooting Sports Division:
 Accessories
 Ammunition
 Cleaning equipment
 Clothing
 Firearms and Air Guns
 Optics
 Powders
 Protection
 Reloading Equipment
 Shooting Targets
 Scope Covers
 Tools
 Torches
 Moderators
 Mounts and Bases

 Police and Military Division:
 Clothing and Footwear
 Firearms and Accessories
 Knives
 Pens
 PMD / Optics
 PMD / Torches
 Protection
 Thermal Imaging
 Training

 Airsoft Division
 Outdoor Division
 Shop
 Outdoor clothing
 Tactical clothing
 Armoury:
 Air rifle Servicing
 Firearm Servicing

See also
Black Hills Ammunition
Crye Precision (MultiCam)
SureFire

References

External links
Edgar Brothers Official Website
Smith Optics
Soldier Systems

British companies established in 1947
Companies based in Cheshire
Defence companies of the United Kingdom
1947 establishments in England
Manufacturing companies established in 1947